The Red River of Wisconsin is a  tributary of the Wolf River. It flows through Gresham and has a dam. Below Gresham, the Red River flows into the Wolf River in northern Shawano County.

References

Rivers of Wisconsin
Rivers of Shawano County, Wisconsin